Zelma may refer to:

Places

Australia 

 Zelma, Queensland, a town in the Mackay Region

United States 

Zelma, Indiana, unincorporated community in Pleasant Run Township, Lawrence County, Indiana
Zelma, Saskatchewan, small hamlet in Saskatchewan

People 

Zelma Davis, Liberian-born singer who rose to fame in the early 1990s
Zelma Hedin (1827–1874), Swedish actress
Zelma Henderson (1920–2008), the last surviving plaintiff in the 1954 landmark federal school desegregation case
Zelma Huppatz (1906–1982), Australian army nurse and hospital matron
Zelma Long, American enologist and winemaker
Zelma Watson George (1903–1994), well known African American philanthropist

Fictional characters 

 The Groovy Girls doll line, by Manhattan Toy, features a doll named Zelma.

Organizations 

Zelma Hutsell Elementary School, public primary school in Katy, Texas, United States